Araguaína is a municipality located in the Brazilian state of Tocantins.

Education

Higher education

The city has campuses from several higher education institutions.

There are two campuses of the public Federal University of Tocantins State (UFT). One campus is in the neighborhood Cimba, which has courses in Portuguese, English, Mathematics, physics, chemistry, geography, history, logistics, cooperativism, and tourism. The other campus is outside of the city, which has courses in veterinary sciences and zoology.

The city is home to the private university ITPAC, an educational institute offering medical, dentistry, and law classes.

Another private university is Santa Cruz, which has courses in law.

The private university Facit has courses in ortodontology, and software development.

Transport

Public transport in the city is done by the bus companies Cooperlota and Lontra.

The city is served by Araguaína Airport.

References

IBGE - 

Municipalities in Tocantins
1958 establishments in Brazil